Storhamar is a neighborhood of Hamar, Norway, west of the town center and formerly in the municipality Vang. It is the location of the distillery Arcus, the national lottery Norsk Tipping and the Hamar Olympic Amphitheatre sports venue. Norwegian sports club Storhamar IL comes from the area.

Hamar